The Shiroro Power Station is a hydroelectric power plant of the Kaduna River in  Niger State, Nigeria. It has a power generating capacity of  enough to power over 404,000 homes

The Shiroro Power Station began operating in 1990.

See also
List of dams and reservoirs in Nigeria
Shiroro Airstrip

References

Energy infrastructure completed in 1990
Hydroelectric power stations in Nigeria
Niger State
20th-century architecture in Nigeria